Valila or Välilä may refer to:
 Valila, Estonia
 Valila, Iran
 Flavius Valila Theodosius, a Roman-Goth senator and general of the fifth century AD
 Mika Välilä (born 1970), retired Swedish professional ice hockey player